The 1988–89 season was Stoke City's 82nd season in the Football League and 29th in the Second Division.

With the sale of both Lee Dixon and Steve Bould to Arsenal manager Mick Mills was able to enter the transfer market where he bought Peter Beagrie and Chris Kamara. The hope now would be that Stoke could mount a serious promotion challenge but again results were far too inconsistent and Stoke ended the season in mid-table for a third straight season.

Season review

League
During the summer of 1988 Phil Heath moved to Oxford United for £80,000 and that, combined with the fee received for Lee Dixon and Steve Bould, allowed manager Mills to bring in some new faces. He brought to the club Peter Beagrie signed from Sheffield United for £215,000 and midfielder Chris Kamara from Swindon Town as well as veteran John Gidman. Stoke started the 1988–89 season with a 1–1 draw at home to Ipswich Town and it took until their seventh match against Walsall to  claim their first victory of the season. By this time two defenders Mark Higgins and John Butler had been added to the ranks and with Stoke's back line more secure results started to improve and after a 4–0 win against Hull City in mid-November Stoke lay in 7th position.

However performances dropped and by the new year Stoke had fallen into 13th in the table. And that is where Stoke remained despite a rather worrying end to the season which saw Stoke register just one win in their last 14 matches. This prompted rumours that Mills' contract would not be extended for another year but the board eventually agreed to give him another chance, a decision that they would go on to regret.

FA Cup
Stoke beat Crystal Palace 1–0 thanks to a goal from Graham Shaw and after an entertaining 3–3 with Barnsley, the "Tykes" won the replay 2–1.

League Cup
Fourth Division Leyton Orient knocked Stoke out in the second round via a penalty shoot-out after a 3–3 aggregated draw.

Full Members' Cup
Stoke were well beaten 3–0 by Southampton in the first round at The Dell, Danny Wallace scoring a hat trick.

Final league table

Results

Legend

Football League Second Division

FA Cup

League Cup

Full Members' Cup

Friendlies

Squad statistics

References

Stoke City F.C. seasons
Stoke